A father figure is usually an older man, normally one with power, authority, or strength, with whom one can identify on a deeply psychological level and who generates emotions generally felt towards one's father. Despite the literal term "father figure", the role of a father figure is not limited to the biological parent of a person (especially a child), but may be played by uncles, grandfathers, elder brothers, family friends, or others. The similar term mother figure refers to an older woman.

Several studies have suggested that positive father figures and mother figures (whether biological or not) are generally associated with healthy child development, both in boys and in girls.

Definition
The International Dictionary of Psychology defines "father figure" as "A man to whom a person looks up and whom he treats like a father." The APA Concise Dictionary of Psychology offers a more extensive definition: "a substitute for a person's biological father, who performs typical paternal functions and serves as an object of identification and attachment. [Father figures] may include such individuals as adoptive fathers, stepfathers, older brothers, teachers and others." This dictionary goes on to state that the term is synonymous with father surrogate and surrogate father. The former definition suggests that the term applies to any man, while the latter excludes biological fathers.

Significance in child development
As a primary caregiver, a father or father-figure fills a key role in a child's life. Attachment theory offers some insight into how children relate to their fathers, and when they seek out a separate "father figure". According to a 2010 study by Posada and Kaloustian, the way that an infant models their attachment to their caregiver has a direct impact on how the infant responds to other people. These attachment-driven responses may persist throughout life.

Studies by Parke and Clark-Stewart (2011) and Lamb (2010) have shown that fathers are more likely than mothers to engage in rough-and-tumble play with children.

Other functions a father figure can provide include: helping establish personal boundaries between mother and child; promoting self-discipline, teamwork and a sense of gender identity; offering a window into the wider world; and providing opportunities for both idealization and its realistic working-through.

Lack

Studies have shown that a lack of a father figure in a child's life can have severe negative psychological impacts upon a child's personality and psychology, whereas positive father figures have a significant role in a child's development.

Cultural aspects

Leaders such as Franklin D. Roosevelt have been seen as acting as father figures for their followers, while a similar role may be played by the therapist in the transference.
Alfred Pennyworth is the butler and father figure to Bruce Wayne, who is also Batman in DC Comics. Alfred looks after young Bruce Wayne after his parents are murdered during a street robbery.
Mycroft Holmes is sometimes seen to be a father figure to Sherlock Holmes, especially in the 1970 film The Private Life of Sherlock Holmes and in the 2010 TV series Sherlock.
Captain Haddock is mostly seen to be a father figure to Tintin, especially in Tintin in Tibet.
Lord Durham adopted his father-in-law, Charles Grey, as a father-figure, the consequent ambivalence in their relationship impacting negatively on their work for the Great Reform Act.
In the Star Wars franchise, Obi-Wan Kenobi is viewed as a father figure to protagonist Luke Skywalker.
Harry Potter has been seen as seeking a succession of father figures, from Rubeus Hagrid to Albus Dumbledore, contrasted from the role of Lord Voldemort as the counterpart and negative aspect of the father figure.
Tigger is always seen as a father figure to Roo, especially in The Tigger Movie.
Wolverine in the Marvel Comics became a father figure for the young x-woman Kitty Pryde. He also taught her martial arts and how to use katana.
Ben Parker in the Marvel Comics became a father figure for Peter Parker/Spider-Man.
Gandalf in The Lord of the Rings is a father figure to Frodo Baggins.
Bobby Singer is always seen as a father figure to Dean and Sam in Supernatural.
Mr Miyagi can be seen as a father figure to Daniel LaRusso in The Karate Kid.
Kingsley Martin said of Leonard Woolf that "he was always ready to advise me, and became, I think, something of a Father Figure to me".

See also

References

Fatherhood
Male stock characters
Interpersonal relationships
Positions of authority
Developmental psychology